New City Commercial Corporation Malls or NCCC Malls, commonly known as just NCCC are shopping malls owned by the New City Commercial Corporation (NCCC) Group. The company is founded and is based in Davao City, Philippines.

History 
NCCC began as a textile store in Davao City during the 1950's by Lim Tian Siu. The store eventually evolved into a general merchandise store selling basic necessities and other items like shoes and jewelry.

In 1978, the family opened the first NCCC Supermarket and Department Store at Ramon Magsaysay Avenue and named it New City Commercial Center.

By 1987, NCCC opened its Tagum City branch.

Then in 1991, NCCC opened its first mall in Puerto Princesa City, Palawan. This was also the first mall in the island.

In 1999, the company expanded its branch in Tagum City with the opening of NCCC Mall Tagum.

Within 30 years NCCC has become a conglomerate. It has diversified into department stores with their NCCC Department Stores, breads and pastries with Breadfactory, health products and pharmacies with HB1, hardware and home fixtures with Hardwaremaxx, and movies and theater NCCC Cinemas.

Fire incidents

2013 NCCC Mall Palawan fire 
In 2013, a 6-hour fire ravaged the topmost floor of the building that served as the department store’s main storage area in NCCC Mall Palawan.

2017 NCCC Mall Davao fire

Branches

External links 
 NCCC Official Website

References 

Retail companies of the Philippines